Omniscient is a Brazilian science fiction streaming television series created by Pedro Aguilera and starring Carla Salle, Sandra Corveloni and Jonathan Haagensen. The plot revolves around a society with an all-knowing security system in place.

It premiered on Netflix on January 29, 2020.

Cast
 Carla Salle as Nina Peixoto
 Sandra Corveloni as Judite Almeida
 Jonathan Haagensen as Vinícius Moreira
 Guilherme Prates as Daniel Peixoto
 Luana Tanaka as Olívia Okamoto
 Marcello Airoldi as Ricardo
 Marco Antônio Pâmio as Inácio Peixoto
 Bruno Lourenço as Sílvio
 Belize Pombal as Débora
 Fernanda Viacava as Carolina Borges
 Wladimir Candini as Henrique Ambrósio
 Guilherme Moilaqua as Caio
 Camilla Veles as Lúcia
 Wynner Gonzalez as Euribiades

Release
Omniscient was released on January 29, 2020 on Netflix.

References

External links
 
 

2010s Brazilian television series
2020 Brazilian television series debuts
Brazilian drama television series
Brazilian science fiction television series
Portuguese-language Netflix original programming
Television series set in the future
Dystopian television series
Mass surveillance in fiction